The Akar class is a series of two replenishment oilers and fleet support ships, designed and built for service in the Turkish Navy. The lead ship of the class, was constructed in 1982–1983 and entered service in 1987. The second ship, was constructed in 1993–1994 and entered service in 1995. Both ships were constructed in Turkey, though Yarbay Kudret Güngör was the first ship built for the Turkish Navy by a private shipyard. Both vessels remain in service.

Description
The Akar class is designed for underway replenishment of Turkish Navy vessels and are rated as replenishment oilers and fleet support ships.

The two vessels, Akar and Yarbay Kudret Güngör have different capacities. The vessels have a helicopter pad over the stern capable of landing medium helicopters. The two vessels also differ in armament. Akar has twin-mounted /50 calibre guns and twin-mounted Bofors /70 guns. Yarbay Kudret Güngör mounts a  Mk 15 Phalanx CIWS and twin Bofors 40 mm guns. For the 76 mm guns, Akar is equipped Mk 63 fire-control system while Yarbay Kudret Güngör mounts SPG-34 fire-control radar. The vessels have a complement of 203 including 14 officers.

List of ships

Construction and career
The two ships of the Akar class were constructed in different decades. Akar was named for Akar, and Yarbay Kudret Güngör for the commander of  who died during a naval exercise in 1992. Akar was laid down in 1982 at Gölcük Naval Shipyard, Kocaeli, Turkey. The vessel was launched in 1983 and commissioned in 1987. Yarbay Kudret Güngör was laid down in 1993 by Sedef Shipyard at Istanbul, Turkey, launched in 1994 and commissioned in 1995. Yarbay Kudret Güngör was the first Turkish naval ship to be constructed by a private shipyard. Akar is primarily used as an oiler while Yarbay Kudret Güngör is used as a logistic support ship.

See also
 List of Turkish Navy ships

Notes

Citations

References
 
 

Auxiliary replenishment ship classes
Auxiliary ships of the Turkish Navy